Greentree is a  estate in Manhasset, New York on Long Island.

Greentree may also refer to:

 Greentree, New Jersey, United States
 Greentree Business Software, a software company from New Zealand
 Greentree Stable, an American thoroughbred horse racing stable and breeding business

People with the surname

 Kyle Greentree (born 1983), Canadian professional ice hockey player
 Leslie Greentree (21st century), Canadian poet

See also

 Green Tree, Pennsylvania, United States
 Greentree Corner